Wyk is a village in Poland.

Wyk, or WYK or Van Wyk may also refer to:

 West Yorkshire, a county in England, Chapman code
 Wyk auf Föhr, a town on the German island of Föhr, Schleswig-Holstein
 Wah Yan College, Kowloon, a Catholic boys-only secondary school in Hong Kong
van Wyk, a South African surname
Van Wyk and Grumbach syndrome, in girls

See also
Wijk (disambiguation)